The Denmark Billie Jean King Cup team represents Denmark in the Billie Jean King Cup tennis competition and are governed by the Dansk Tennis Forbund.  They currently compete in the Europe/Africa Zone of Group II.  They rank 53rd in the world with 547.50 points.

History
Denmark competed in its first Fed Cup in 1963.  Their best result was reaching the quarterfinals in 1976 and 1988.

Current team (2019)

Caroline Wozniacki
Karen Barritza
Emilie Francati
Maria Jespersen
Clara Tauson

See also
Fed Cup
Denmark Davis Cup team

External links

Billie Jean King Cup teams
Fed Cup
Fed Cup